1880 earthquake may refer to:

 1880 Zagreb earthquake in Croatia
 1880 Luzon earthquakes in the Philippines

See also 
 :Category:1880 earthquakes
 List of historical earthquakes § 19th century